Serine/threonine-protein kinase OSR1 is an enzyme that in humans is encoded by the OXSR1 gene.

The product of this gene belongs to the Ser/Thr protein kinase family of proteins. It regulates downstream kinases in response to environmental stress, and may play a role in regulating the actin cytoskeleton.

References

Further reading